The 1985 Open Championship was a men's major golf championship and the 114th Open Championship, held from 18 to 21 July at Royal St George's Golf Club in Sandwich, England. Sandy Lyle won his only Open Championship, one stroke ahead of runner-up Payne Stewart. It was the first of his two major titles; Lyle added a green jacket as Masters champion in 1988.

This was the last year the Open Championship featured the double cut (after 36 holes and 54 holes), introduced in 1968.

Past champions in the field

Made both cuts

Missed the second cut

Missed the first cut

Round summaries

First round
Thursday, 18 July 1985

Second round
Friday, 19 July 1985

Amateurs: Gilford (+6), Olazábal (+8), Evans (+15), Davis (+16) McGimpsey (+16), Homewood (+18), Purdie (+24), Latham (+28)

Third round
Saturday, 20 July 1985

Amateurs: Olazábal (+9), Gilford (+12).

Final round
Sunday, 21 July 1985

Amateurs: Olazábal (+9)
Source:

References

External links
Royal St George's 1985 (Official site)
114th Open Championship – Royal St George's (European Tour)
1985 Open Championship (GolfCompendium.com)

The Open Championship
Golf tournaments in England
Open Championship
Open Championship
Open Championship